Rochefort, unofficially Rochefort-sur-Mer for disambiguation, is a city and commune in Southwestern France, a port on the Charente estuary. It is a subprefecture of the Charente-Maritime department, located in the administrative region of Nouvelle-Aquitaine (before 2015: Poitou-Charentes). In 2018, it had a population of 23,583.

Geography
Rochefort lies on the river Charente, close to its outflow into the Atlantic Ocean. It is about 30 km southeast of La Rochelle. Rochefort station has rail connections to La Rochelle, Nantes and Bordeaux.

History
In December 1665, Rochefort was chosen by Jean-Baptiste Colbert as a place of "refuge, defence and supply" for the French Navy. The Arsenal de Rochefort served as a naval base and dockyard until it closed in 1926.

In September 1757, Rochefort was the target of an ambitious British raid during the Seven Years' War.

Another infrastructure of early Rochefort from 1766 was its bagne, a high-security penal colony involving hard labour. Bagnes were then common fixtures in military harbors and naval bases, such as Toulon or Brest, because they provided free labor. During the Jacobin period of the French Revolution (1790–95), over 800 Roman Catholic priests and other clergy who refused to take the anti-Papal oath of the "Civil Constitution of the Clergy" were put aboard a fleet of prison ships in Rochefort harbour, where most died due to inhumane conditions.

Off Rochefort, from the island of Île-d'Aix where he had spent several days hoping to flee to America, Napoleon Bonaparte surrendered to Captain F. L. Maitland aboard HMS Bellerophon, on 17 July 1815, ending the "Hundred Days".

Rochefort is a notable example of 17th-century "ville nouvelle" or new town, which means its design and building resulted from a political decree. The reason for building Rochefort was to a large extent that royal power could hardly depend on rebellious Protestant La Rochelle, which Cardinal Richelieu had to besiege a few decades earlier. Well into the 20th century, Rochefort remained primarily a garrison town. The tourist industry, which had long existed due to the town's spa, gained emphasis in the 1990s.

Population

Sights

Noteworthy buildings of the original naval establishment include:
 a hospital, incorporating a School of Naval Medicine (now a museum)
 the Arsenal with a monumental gateway and the National Navy Museum (Musée National de la Marine)
 the Rope Factory (corderie), at over 370 metres long for centuries the longest manufacturing building in the world
 three dry docks (radoubs) for shipbuilding and repair
 a cannon foundry (not open to the public)

Other sights include:
 a rare transporter bridge (pont transbordeur), consisting of a high level bridge containing a transport mechanism from which a ferry platform is suspended. This bridge, the Rochefort-Martrou Transporter Bridge, built in 1900, is the only remaining one in France and one of only eight still in service world-wide
 the municipal theatre (la Coupe d'Or)
 the railway station
 Saint-Louis church
 Pierre Loti's house (closed indefinitely pending completion of renovation work)
 Museums of Naval Aeronautics, old-time trades (Commerces d'Autrefois), and local archaeology (la Vieille Paroisse)
 Conservatoire du Bégonia, the world's largest begonia collection
 L'Hermione, a replica of a 1779 frigate completed in the town in 2014

Notable inhabitants

Rochefort was the birthplace of:
 Louis-René Levassor de Latouche Tréville (1745–1804), French admiral.
 Charles Rigault de Genouilly (1807–1873), French admiral, conqueror of Vietnam.
 Pierre Loti (1850–1923), a French naval officer and novelist. His house is now a museum.
 Amédée William Merlaud-Ponty (1866-1915), Governor General of French West Africa.
 Pauline Réage (1907–1998), pseudonym of Anne Desclos,  author
 Maurice Merleau-Ponty (1908–1961), philosopher
 Pierre Salviac, (born 1946), a French journalist, former rugby-match commentator and since then polemicist.

International relations

Rochefort is twinned with:
 Torrelavega, Cantabria, Spain
 Papenburg, Lower Saxony, Germany

See also
Communes of the Charente-Maritime department
 Kaolin deposits of the Charentes Basin
The Young Girls of Rochefort film directed by Jacques Demy with Catherine Deneuve, Françoise Dorléac, and Gene Kelly with music composed by Michel Legrand

References

Movies: "Les Demoiselles De Rochefort" 1967 - Jacques Demy

External links

 
Populated coastal places in France
Communes of Charente-Maritime
Spa towns in France
Subprefectures in France
Port cities and towns on the French Atlantic coast
Aunis
Charente-Maritime communes articles needing translation from French Wikipedia